Mocis laxa is a species of moth of the family Erebidae. It is found in China (Tibet, Qinghai), India (Sikkim) and Bangladesh.

References

Moths described in 1858
Mocis
Moths of Asia